Roger Edgeworth, D.D. (d. 1560) was an English Roman Catholic theologian. Edgeworth was born at Holt Castle, the seat of Sir William Stanley, brother to the Earl of Derby, situate on the banks of the Dee, in the county of Denbigh, but within the diocese of Chester. He became a student in the University of Oxford about 1503, proceeded B.A. in 1507, and was elected a fellow of Oriel College 8 November 1508 on the foundation of Bishop Smyth, being the first holder of that fellowship. He was not actually admitted to the fellowship till 11 June 1510, and he resigned it on 15 March 1518.

He commenced M.A. 9 February 1511–12, was admitted B.D. 13 Oct. 1519, and created D.D. 2 July 1526. After taking holy orders he was a noted preacher in the university and elsewhere. He became prebendary of the second stall in the cathedral church of Bristol, being nominated to that dignity by the charter of erection in 1542. On 3 Oct. 1543 he was admitted to the vicarage of St. Cuthbert at Wells. He was a canon of the cathedrals of Salisbury and Wells, and was admitted chancellor of the diocese of Wells 30 April 1554, on the deprivation of John Taylor, alias Cardmaker.

He likewise obtained the prebend of Slape, or Slope, in the church of Salisbury, and held it till his death. 'When K. Hen. 8 had extirpated the pope's power, he seemed to be very moderate, and also in the reign of K. Ed. 6, but when qu. Mary succeeded he shew'd himself a most zealous person for the Roman Catholic religion, and a great enemy to Luther and reformers'.

He died in the beginning of 1560, and was buried before the choir door in Wells Cathedral. His will was proved on 1 June 1560. He was a benefactor to Oriel College.

Works
He was the author of: 1. 'Resolutions concerning the Sacraments.' In Burnet's 'Hist. of the Reformation.' 2. 'Resolutions of some Questions relating to Bishops and Priests, and of other matters tending to the Reformation of the Church made by Henry VIII,’ ibid. 3. 'Sermons, very Fruitfull, Godly, and Learned, … With a repertorie or table, directinge to many notable matters expressed in the same Sermons. In ædibus Roberti Caley,’ London, 4to, 1557, containing 307 folios in black letter. At the beginning of the eighteenth sermon he states that he had abstained from preaching for five or six years, viz. during the reign of Edward VI; consequently the former sermons were delivered in Henry VIII's time, and the rest after Queen Mary's accession. Dibdin, in his 'Library Companion' (i. 81–5), after giving copious extracts from this very scarce volume, remarks that 'upon the whole Edgeworth is less nervous and familiar than Latimer, less eloquent than Fox, and less learned and logical than Drant. He is, however, a writer of a fine fancy, and an easy and flowing style.'

References

Year of birth missing
1560 deaths
English religious writers
16th-century English writers
16th-century male writers
16th-century English Roman Catholic theologians
People from Chester